San Pedro Totolapa is a town and municipality in Oaxaca in south-western Mexico.
It is part of the Tlacolula District in the east of the Valles Centrales Region.

As of 2010, the municipality had a total population of 2,603.

References

Municipalities of Oaxaca